Virgin Black is an Australian symphonic gothic and doom metal band. The band was signed to The End Records (for the United States) and Germany's Massacre Records (for Europe), through which it released four albums and one EP. A fifth album, originally planned for release in 2006, was released independently in 2018. As of 2021, they are signed to Australian record label, Dark Escapes Music. Formed in 1995 in Adelaide, they have achieved international acclaim during their career, receiving praise from such magazines as Orkus, Metal Hammer, Legacy and The Village Voice.

Having changed their line-up several times, Virgin Black currently consists of the founding members and main songwriters: Sesca Scaarba (formerly Samantha Escarbe) (guitar) and Rowan London (keyboard, vocals), with Grayh (bass) and Luke Faz (drums) joining in 2007. The group explains the meaning of its name as "the juxtaposition of purity and humanity's darkness".

History

Early days
Virgin Black was originally formed in Adelaide by guitarist Sesca Scaarba, and vocalist and keyboards-player Rowan London. In 1995, Virgin Black recorded a four-track self-titled demo in a doom/death style. Due to the rarity and demand for this recording, the band has speculated that it may be re-released at some point.  Their Trance EP was released in 1998, and the group began gaining international recognition with that recording. This EP was later included as part of a special limited edition (U.S. only) with the band's debut album, Sombre Romantic.

Record deal

The group began recording their first full-length album Sombre Romantic in 1999.
The album displays an expansively cinematic, symphonic style with London contributing a diverse vocal style from shrieks and growls to soaring melodies and choral chants. On the strength of this self-released debut, Virgin Black signed to Germany's Massacre Records for Europe and also to the U.S. label The End. Both labels then released Sombre Romantic in their territories.

After completing their second album during 2002, Virgin Black played at Germany's Wave-Gotik-Treffen festival in 2003 and did a tour through the US west coast with Agalloch and Antimatter before returning to Australia and conducting a national tour. Elegant... and Dying featured Escarbe contributing cello and guest musician Sonia Wilkie playing flute. It was released in November and a month later the band appeared at the Metal for the Brain festival in Canberra. Early the following year, Virgin Black toured alongside Opeth in Australia, and later did a tour of the Australian east coast capitals with Sydney black metal band Nazxul before making a start on their next recordings.

Requiem trilogy
Virgin Black's next project began with London and Escarbe composing a series of scores for what was to become the three-volume Requiem set. On 10 March 2006, The End Records issued a press release explaining the upcoming releases. The first part of the trilogy, Requiem - Pianissimo, is a strictly classically oriented album featuring the Adelaide Symphony Orchestra, choral singing, and solo singers. Requiem - Mezzo Forte features music similar to the band's previous releases with the last part Requiem - Fortissimo  primarily having a death/doom metal sound. The albums were recorded primarily as the duo of London and Escarbe over the course of almost two years, during which Rowan London suffered the death of his father. Originally designed to be released simultaneously in 2006, on 23 July, The Labels announced that the albums would instead be released during 2007 in a staggered time scale. The second part of the trilogy, Requiem - Mezzo Forte was issued first, on 3 April 2007.

With a new line-up of Escarbe, London, Grayh on bass and drummer Luke Faz. Virgin Black played some Australian shows with Arcturus in March and headlined the Elements of Rock Festival in Switzerland in April. Virgin Black announced a US tour for June and July 2007, and played shows on the east and west coast of the U.S. with To/Die/For and headlined shows in Mexico City, Monterrey, and Guadalajara.

The third part and the second installment in the Requiem trilogy, Requiem  - Fortissimo was released on 19 February 2008 by The End Records. The Massacre Records release date remains unknown. Virgin Black played with Amorphis and Samael for a North American tour in fall 2008. Readers of the website Metal Storm voted Requiem Fortissimo for "the best doom metal album of 2008".

On 2 November 2012 it was announced on the band's official Facebook page that "...Virgin Black is still on an extended hiatus but preparing themselves for a return at some stage, and the release of Pianissimo when that happens", and went on to say that "...it might not be for some time yet, but thank you for your patience and continued enthusiasm for the band regardless".

On 4 September 2018, after 10 years of silence, the band posted the first two songs from their long-awaited Pianissimo release. The songs are titled Requiem Aeternum and Dies Irae, with a total duration of 13:12. On 27 September 2018, the band speculated the date for the release of the complete album, scheduled for 30 November of that year, said in its official website that Virgin Black has broken ties with former record companies. In December 2018 the album appeared on YouTube.

Virgin Black Return 
On 25 November 2021, Virgin Black released Sombre Romantic on streaming services globally after signing with independent record label Dark Escapes Music. A cinematic music video for Walk Without Limbs was released on YouTube to accompany the release.

Style and influence
Virgin Black's sound combines elements of doom metal and classical music. A critic described their style as having influences of "dark wave with gothic atmosphere" and "symphonic gothic-doom". Virgin Black states that their influences include the British group My Dying Bride, the American gothic metal band Saviour Machine and 19th century classical music. Their sound is typically sorrowful, representing mostly down-tempo arrangements. Rowan London employs various vocal styles including operatic, shrieking, death growls and melodramatic tenor and baritone singing, and the music often features choirs. Occasionally the lead guitarist Sesca Scaarba plays faster tremolo riffs typical of extreme metal, such as on "Drink the Midnight Hymn" from the debut album. Sometimes there are longer, mellow and emotional guitar solos such as on "Weep for Me". A great deal of variety can be found in their music. For instance, "Walk without Limbs" combines ominous cello with programmed drums for a softer darkwave style, the Requiem - Pianissimo album is entirely classical, whereas Requiem - Fortissimo'''s sound is firmly rooted in death/doom metal.

Members
Current
 Sesca Scaarba - guitars, cello (1995–present)
 Rowan London - keyboards, vocals (1995–present)

Former
 Aaron Nicholls - bass (1996–1998)
 Brad Bessell - bass
 Ian Miller - bass
 Craig Edis - guitar (1995–2005), bass (2008), vocals
 Grayh - bass, vocals
 Luke Faz - drums
 Dino Cielo - drums, vocals
 Kelvin Sugars - drums
 David Mason - guitar
 Matt Enright - drums

Live
 Mark Kelson - guitar (2007)
 Matthew Phillips - bass

Discography
Demos and EPsVirgin Black (1996)Trance (1998)

AlbumsSombre Romantic (2001)Elegant... and Dying (2003)Requiem – Mezzo Forte (2007)Requiem – Fortissimo (2008)Requiem – Pianissimo'' (2018)

References

External links

Official 2018 band page
The End Records band page

Musical groups established in 1993
Musical groups from Adelaide
Australian heavy metal musical groups
Australian gothic metal musical groups
Rowe Productions artists